Matthew Joseph O'Leary  (born July 6, 1987) is an American actor. He made his debut in the made-for-television Disney Channel Original film Mom's Got a Date with a Vampire (2000), and would go on to star in the thriller Domestic Disturbance (2001) opposite John Travolta. He also had supporting roles in Frailty (2001), and the independent neo-noir film Brick (2005).

In 2011, he starred opposite Rachael Harris in the critically acclaimed independent film Natural Selection, followed by a lead role in Fat Kid Rules the World (2012). He had a minor part in Gore Verbinski's The Lone Ranger (2013), and lead roles in the horror films Stung (2015) and Bokeh (2017).

Career
O'Leary auditioned for the lead in Home Alone 3 and made his acting debut in the lead role in 2000 in the made-for-television film Mom's Got a Date with a Vampire. He was subsequently cast in the thriller Domestic Disturbance, playing the son of John Travolta's character.

O'Leary next appeared in another thriller, Frailty, directed by Bill Paxton, and in the kids comedy Spy Kids 2: The Island of Lost Dreams, both of which opened in 2002 to positive reviews, gaining O'Leary recognition among teenage audiences. In 2003, O'Leary had a minor role in the third Spy Kids film, Spy Kids 3-D: Game Over, and also appeared in the 2004 drama The Alamo, although most of his role was reduced to one line.

In 2005, O'Leary had a role in Warm Springs, a television film, and Havoc, a drama starring Anne Hathaway that was released directly to video. O'Leary rose to mainstream prominence in the latter half of the 2000s for his roles in Brick, a thriller starring Joseph Gordon-Levitt, and the 2007 films Live Free or Die Hard and Death Sentence. He appeared as Garret in the 2009 film Sorority Row and as Johnny Koffin in Mother's Day, released the following year.

In 2011, O'Leary won the Breakthrough Performance award at the 2011 SXSW Film Festival for his work in the film Natural Selection, with Rachael Harris.

Filmography

Film

Television

Web

References

External links
 

1987 births
Living people
Male actors from Chicago
American male film actors
American male child actors
American male television actors